Sangharsh is a 2018 Indian Bhojpuri language film directed by Parag Patil and produced by Ratnakar Kumar. Khesari Lal Yadav and Kajal Raghwani are in lead roles. Awadhesh Mishra, Ritu Singh, Dev Singh, Sanjay Mahanand and Deepak Sinha in supporting roles.

The film was released on 3 November 2019 on YouTube official channel of "Worldwide Records Bhojpuri"  and quickly became the top trending video and create records in Bhojpuri cinema  with 10 million views in just 3 days. As of May 2020, the film has amassed over 62 million view on YouTube.

Plot
"Sangharsh" highlights one of the most pressing issues of our times: women's empowerment. Through the conflicting perspectives of two men, the film examines the conservative mindset of a highly patriarchal society, how women are oppressed by it and why a change for the better is necessary.
He support Indian government slogans "Beti Bachao Beti Padhao".

Cast
 Khesari Lal Yadav, as Kanhaiya
 Kajal Raghwani, as Rukhmani (Kanhaiya's Wife)
 Awadhesh Mishra, as Loha Yadav (Kanhaiya's Father)
 Ritu Singh as Radha
 Nisha Jha as Sweaty (Kanhaiya's Daughter)
 Dev Singh as Prem (Sweaty's Boyfriend)
 Sanjay Mahanand as Damru (Kanhaiya's Friend)
 Deepak Sinha as Rukhmani's Father
 Ratnakar Kumar as Schools Principal
 Sonu Pandey as House Owner

Release
Sangharsh was released on 24 August 2018 on Hindu Festival Raksha Bandhan all over India. It also received mostly positive reviews and one of the Biggest Hit of 2018 in Bhojpuri Cinema .

Soundtrack

Music of this film was given by Dhananjay Mishra and Madhukar Anand and lyrics penned by Pyare Lal Yadav, Azad Singh and Pawan Pandey. The soundtrack included an unusually large number of songs at 9. It was produced under "Worldwide Records" label. All songs of this film sung by Khesari Lal Yadav, Priyanka Singh, Indu Sonali, Honey B, Neetu Shri and Jitendra Singh.

Track listing

Awards
The film won 11 awards at the Sabrang Film Awards, including Best Film, Best Director for Parag Patil, Best Actor for Khesari Lal Yadav, Best Actress for Kajal Raghwani, Best Story Writer for Rakesh Tripathi, Best Actor In Supporting Role for Awdhesh Mishra, Best Actress  In Supporting Role for Reena Rani, Best Playback Singer (Male) for Khesari Lal Yadav, Best Background Score for Aslam Surti, Best Cinematography for R. R. Prince and Best Costume Design for Badshah Khan.

In Bhojpuri Cinema Screen & Stage Awards (2019), held at Netaji Indoor Stadium, Kolkata on 21 September 2019. The film won four awards including Best Film, Best Director for Parag Patil, Best Actor for Khesari Lal Yadav and Best Actress (Critics) for Kajal Raghwani.

In International Bhojpuri Film Awards (2019) held in Singapore, he won four Awards including Best Film (Critics), Best Actor in Leading Role (Female) for Kajal Raghwani, Best Actor in Supporting Role (Male) for Awadhesh Mishra and Best Story Writer for Rakesh Tripathi.

References

2018 films
2010s Bhojpuri-language films